Doris immonda is a species of sea slug, a dorid nudibranch, a marine gastropod mollusc in the family Dorididae.

Distribution
This species was described from New Caledonia. It is also reported from Australia and the Red Sea.

Description
The relationship of Doris immonda to Doris nucleola Pease, 1860 is discussed and illustrated by Rudman, 2000. It is redescribed in detail by Valdes, 2002.

References

Dorididae
Gastropods described in 1928